Magnetism is a phenomenon in physics by which materials exert an attractive or repulsive force on other materials.

Magnetism may also refer to:
 Magnetism (album), album by Matthew Shipp
 Magnetism, song by Eugene Record
 Animal magnetism, variously sexual attraction, vital force or hypnotism